Héctor Román (born 7 January 1933) is a Puerto Rican athlete. He competed in the men's decathlon at the 1952 Summer Olympics.

References

1933 births
Living people
Athletes (track and field) at the 1952 Summer Olympics
Puerto Rican decathletes
Olympic track and field athletes of Puerto Rico
Place of birth missing (living people)
Central American and Caribbean Games medalists in athletics